These are the international rankings of Germany.

Sources are listed in the respective articles.

International rankings

References

Germany